Stone Cold is a young-adult novel by Robert Swindells, published by Heinemann in 1993. Set in Bradford and on the streets of London, the first-person narrative switches between Link, a newly-homeless young man adjusting to his situation, and Shelter, an ex-army officer scorned after being dismissed from his job, supposedly on "medical grounds", with a sinister motive.

Plot
 
After Link's father abandons his family, Link's mother starts a relationship with a new boyfriend, who forces Link out of the family home in Bradford. Link, now homeless, decides to travel to Camden, London. Here he meets Ginger, a streetwise homeless man, who takes him under his wing. Link and Ginger work together and become friends. 

Meanwhile, a man nicknamed Shelter is busy with his own task. An ex-army member, dismissed for "medical reasons", he is convinced that he must "clear" the streets of the homeless population. He begins abducting and murdering victims, hiding them under the floor of his room and dressing them in army clothes.

One day, Ginger decides to meet his old friends. Link waits for him, but he doesn't return. It transpires that Shelter has abducted Ginger by telling him that Link was at his apartment, badly injured. Link finds out Ginger has been murdered. 

Distressed by Ginger's death, Link enters the company of a mysterious young woman named Gail. They "doss" together and begin to piece the puzzle together, tracing clues to track down Shelter. 

Gail takes a long telephone call and Link wanders off by himself, where he is approached by an old man. Unbeknownst to Link, it is Shelter, who uses the excuse of a missing cat to lure Link into a building. 

Shelter advances on Link, who realises who he is faced with. Link is overpowered and almost suffocated. However, luckily, Gail is able to summon the police in time, and Shelter is arrested. 

Gail tearfully reveals she isn't truly homeless, but rather a journalist who had posed as such in order to write an "authentic" story about homelessness. 

Link feels betrayed, and is angry with Gail. The story ends with a newspaper article featuring an interview with Link. In it, Link ponders the unjustness of a world where he is homeless and hungry, while a murderer like Shelter is housed in a warm prison with 3 meals a day.

Reception

Swindells won the annual Carnegie Medal recognising the year's best children's book by a British subject.

Television

In 1997, the novel was adapted for a television series of the same title, starring James Gaddas, Peter Howitt and Elizabeth Rider, and produced by Andy Rowley. It was nominated for a Best Children's Drama Award at BAFTA. The short series was shown on Scene.

See also
 Homelessness in the United Kingdom

References

External links
  

1993 British novels
1993 children's books
British young adult novels
Novels about homelessness
Street children
Carnegie Medal in Literature winning works
Novels set in Bradford
Novels set in London
Heinemann (publisher) books
Television shows set in Bradford
Television shows set in London